Antonio Baños Alonso (born 7 December 1945) is a Spanish long-distance runner. He competed in the marathon at the 1976 Summer Olympics.

References

1945 births
Living people
Athletes (track and field) at the 1976 Summer Olympics
Spanish male long-distance runners
Spanish male marathon runners
Olympic athletes of Spain
Place of birth missing (living people)
Mediterranean Games gold medalists for Spain
Mediterranean Games medalists in athletics
Athletes (track and field) at the 1975 Mediterranean Games